Tocoyena pittieri is a species of plant in the family Rubiaceae. It is found in Colombia, Costa Rica, Honduras, and Panama.

References

Tocoyena
Vulnerable plants
Taxonomy articles created by Polbot